Stigmastane or 24R-ethylcholestane is a tetracyclic triterpene, along with cholestane and ergostane, this sterane is used as a biomarker for early eukaryotes.

See also
 Stigmastanol (Stigmastan-3β-ol)
 β-Sitosterol (Stigmast-5-en-3β-ol)
 Stigmasterol (Stigmast-5,22-dien-3β-ol)

References

Triterpenes